Shahen Gevorki Khachatryan (born September 28, 1934, Aleppo) is an Armenian art expert. He is the founding director of the Arshile Gorky Museum in Etchmiadzin.

Biography
In 1946, his family moved to Soviet Armenia. Khachatrian finished the Repin Institute of Arts. In 1967 Martiros Sarian appointed Khachatrian as the head of his museum. He directed the Martiros Sarian Museum for over 40 years. In 1991, Shahen Khachatrian also was appointed the head of National Gallery of Armenia. He enriched the gallery's collection with about 500 pieces purchased and collected from different countries and Armenian Diaspora. He led the gallery for 13 years.

Khachatrian published books dedicated to Sarian, Hakobian, Minas and Ayvazovski. He organized 60 exhibitions.

Awards
"Honored Artist of Armenia" (1984)
"Movses Khorenatsi" medal (1998)

External links
Celebration Honoring 75th Birthday of Shahen Khachatryan
SHAHEN KHACHATRIAN TO LECTURE IN LOS ANGELES

People from Aleppo
Syrian people of Armenian descent
Armenian scientists
1934 births
Living people
Syrian emigrants to the Soviet Union
Kechichian family